Eileen Heffernan Stulb (June 23, 1923 – February 26, 2007) was an American amateur golfer.

Personal
Stulb was born in Augusta, Georgia to Marion C. Stulb and Eileen Anna Heffernan Stulb. She died in Augusta, Georgia.

Golfing career
Stulb finished second twice at the Titleholders Championship in 1942 and 1946.  She made the cut once at the U.S. Women's Open in 1951, when she finished in a tie for 27th place.  Stulb was a two-time champion of the Georgia State Women’s Amateur tournament.  She was a quarterfinalist at the Women's Western Amateur on two occasions.

Work
Stulb was the owner of an advertising agency in Augusta. When Fred Corcoran was rehired back on by the LPGA Tour, Stulb was hired to do public relations for the LPGA Tour in the late 1950s and 1960s.

References

External links
Georgia Sports Hall of Fame
LPGA Tour
World Golf profile
Cyber Golf profile
Fotothing profile

American female golfers
Amateur golfers
Golfers from Augusta, Georgia
1923 births
2007 deaths
20th-century American women
20th-century American people
21st-century American women